Hyalosagda is a genus of air-breathing land snails, terrestrial pulmonate gastropod mollusks in the subfamily Sagdinae of the family Sagdidae.

Species 
Species in the genus Hyalosagda include:
 Hyalosagda arboreoides
 Hyalosagda hollandi
 Hyalosagda osculans
 Hyalosagda selenina
 Hyalosagda similis - synonym: Helix ambigua
 Hyalosagda simplex - synonym: Helix delaminata
 Hyalosagda subaquila
 Hyalosagda turbiniformis
 Hyalosagda (Aerotrochus) turbonella (Morelet, 1851)

Hyalosagda (Aerotrochus) Pilsbry, 1926: synonym of Aerotrochus Pilsbry, 1926

References 

 Bank, R. A. (2017). Classification of the Recent terrestrial Gastropoda of the World. Last update: July 16th, 2017.

External links
 Nomenclator Zoologicus info

Sagdidae